The Slovakia national football team represents Slovakia in men's international football competition and it is governed by the Slovak Football Association (SFZ), the governing body for football in Slovakia. Slovakia's home stadium from 2019 is the reconstructed Tehelné pole in Bratislava. Slovakia is one of the newest national football teams in the world, having split from the Czechoslovakia national team after the dissolution of the unified state in 1993. Slovakia maintains its own national side that competes in all major tournaments since.

Slovakia has qualified for three major international tournaments, the 2010 FIFA World Cup, UEFA Euro 2016, and UEFA Euro 2020. Slovakia qualified to the FIFA World Cup in 2010 after winning their qualifying group, despite two defeats against Slovenia. At the World Cup, Slovakia progressed beyond the group stage after a 3–2 win against Italy, before bowing out of the tournament after a 2–1 defeat in the knockout stage against the eventual runners-up Netherlands. It was the first time the national team ever played in a major football competition, after playing every FIFA World Cup qualifying campaign since 1998 and every UEFA European Championship qualifying campaign since 1996, after a 50-year absence from international football due to representing part of the Czechoslovakia team. The nation did come close to securing a berth at the 2006 finals in Germany, after finishing second in their group ahead of Russia and behind Portugal, before drawing Spain in their qualification play-off, in which the Slovaks lost by a wide margin on aggregate (1–5, 1–1).

The national team have achieved some noteworthy results such as the aforementioned win over the then title holders Italy at the 2010 World Cup, and a 1–0 win against Russia in September 2010. Despite this success however, the team later dropped down the rankings and a considerable drop in form went with this, as the team failed to qualify for Euro 2012 finishing their group in fourth place. They also only scored seven goals in the group, only more than minnows Andorra. Slovakia then failed to qualify for the 2014 World Cup, but secured a spot in France for Euro 2016 under head coach Ján Kozák, which helped the team reach their best ever position of 14th in the FIFA World Rankings.

Slovakia's traditional rival is the Czech Republic which they played twice in the qualification for the 1998 World Cup in 1997, winning 2–1 in Bratislava before losing 3–0 in Prague with both teams already eliminated, before playing each other again in 2008 and 2009 in the qualifying round for the 2010 World Cup. In these two meetings, the teams drew 2–2 in Bratislava with the Slovaks winning 2–1 in Prague. But before that, they also played each other in Euro 2008 qualifying, and they lost 3–1 in Prague and 3–0 in Bratislava.

History

The first official match of the first Slovak Republic (1939–1945) was played in Bratislava against Germany on 27 August 1939, and ended in a 2–0 victory for Slovakia. After the Second World War, the national football team was subsumed into the team of Czechoslovakia, and for over 50 years Slovakia played no matches as an independent country. During this period, they contributed several key players to the Czechoslovak team, including the majority of the team that won the UEFA Euro 1976 (8 of the 11 players who defeated West Germany in the final were Slovak).

Slovakia's first official international after regaining independence was a 1–0 victory in Dubai over the United Arab Emirates on 2 February 1994. Their first match on Slovak soil was a 4–1 win over Croatia in Bratislava on 20 April 1994. Slovakia suffered their biggest defeat since independence (6–0) on 22 June 1995, in Mendoza, against Argentina. Their biggest wins (7–0) have come against Liechtenstein in 2004 and San Marino (twice) in 2007 and 2009.

Slovakia attempted qualifying for a major championship as an independent team for the first time in Euro 1996 qualifying, but finished in third place in their qualifying group, behind Romania and France, recording wins against Poland, Israel and Azerbaijan, twice. In the 1998 World Cup qualifiers, Slovakia finished fourth in their six-team group with five wins, one draw and four defeats. Their first four games in this were all wins, one of them against their Czech neighbors, helping the team reach their highest FIFA World Ranking to date, 17th.

Slovakia participated in the FIFA World Cup for the first time as an independent nation after finishing in first in 2010 FIFA World Cup qualification – UEFA Group 3 ahead of Slovenia, Czech Republic, Northern Ireland and Poland. On 14 October 2009, they clinched qualification with a 1–0 away win against Poland. On 24 June 2010, at the tournament proper, Slovakia finished second in the group stage after defeating reigning champions Italy in a game which ESPN dubbed "epic": the game saw three goals being scored after the 80th minute, two by Italy and one by Slovakia, as well as a disallowed goal by Italy flagged offside by "the tightest of decisions". The result led Slovakia to the knockout stage and eliminated Italy, who finished last in the group. The result of this match meant that for the first time in World Cup history, both finalists from the previous tournament had been eliminated from the first round, champion Italy and runner-up France.

In the round of 16, Slovakia played the Netherlands in the round of 16, falling behind 2–0 only to score a late goal from the penalty spot by striker Róbert Vittek, the last kick of the game in a 2–1 defeat. Despite elimination, the goal returned Vittek to the top of the goalscoring charts joint top with David Villa until Villa himself later scored against Portugal in Spain's 1–0 win in the same stage of the tournament.

For Euro 2012 qualification, Slovakia was drawn against Russia, the Republic of Ireland, Armenia, Macedonia and Andorra. The good campaign in South Africa boosted team performance ahead of the qualifiers, which started in September with two 1–0 wins against Macedonia in Štadión Pasienky and Russia away. In October, however, they were easily beaten in Armenia (3–1) and drew 1–1 against the Republic of Ireland at home. In February 2011, the team was stunned in a 2–1 friendly defeat against Luxembourg and could only beat group minnows Andorra by one goal. Despite creating better chances, Slovakia earned a goalless draw with Ireland away. Four days later, after creating chances in a goalless first half, Slovakia conceded four goals to Armenia in a match that eliminated the team. In the final two group matches, Slovakia was beaten at home by Russia (1–0) and drew 1–1 in Macedonia, finishing in a mediocre fourth-place position and scoring only seven goals in the entire process. Also, for the first time since the Euro 1996 qualifying process, Slovakia finished a qualifying campaign with a negative goal differential. As a result of this outcome, coach Vladimír Weiss left his job after four full years, being replaced by his assistants Michal Hipp and Stanislav Griga, although both themselves were later replaced due to poor results. By late June, former Czechoslovakia national team footballer Ján Kozák became the head coach and followed-up the unsuccessful qualification campaign with a victory in Bosnia and Herzegovina followed by two defeats to Bosnia and Greece.

For Euro 2016 qualification, Slovakia was drawn against Spain, Ukraine, Belarus, Macedonia and Luxembourg. Slovakia began the qualifying campaign with a 1–0 victory against Ukraine in Kyiv. On 9 October 2014, Slovakia beat Spain 2–1 in a shock victory and claimed the first place. Slovakia's 3–1 victory over Belarus confirmed their status as group leaders. Later on, they won 2–0 against Macedonia in the Philip II Arena, beat Luxembourg with a score of 3–0 in Žilina, and beat Macedonia 2–1 on 14 June 2015, also in Žilina. The next matches were a 2–0 defeat against Spain, a goalless draw against Ukraine and a shocking 0–1 home defeat against Belarus. The team finished qualification by defeating Luxembourg 4–2 and got the second place, qualifying to their first European Championship.

Slovakia was drawn in Group B of Euro 2016 alongside England, Russia and Wales. Slovakia began their tournament against Wales where Ondrej Duda scored Slovakia's first goal in the history of the European Championship in an eventual 2–1 defeat. Slovakia then defeated Russia 2–1 with goals from Vladimír Weiss III and Marek Hamšík, then drew 0–0 against England to advance to the round of 16 as one of the tournament's best third-placed teams. They were eliminated at this stage by world champions Germany with a 3–0 defeat.

During the qualification campaign for the 2018 FIFA World Cup, Slovakia was drawn in UEFA Group F. They were third in the group after the penultimate match ended in a 1–0 defeat to Scotland, who moved up to second place. Slovakia won their final group match 3–0 against Malta, and overtook Scotland after they failed to beat Slovenia, but missed out on a play-off place as the other second teams' results meant Slovakia finished as the worst group runners-up.

Slovakia struggled to qualify for the UEFA Euro 2020, only reached the tournament after a difficult away win over Northern Ireland. Being drawn with Spain, Sweden and Poland in group E, it was thought the Slovaks would be the breadbasket for the remaining teams, but they surprised by a victorious opening against Poland 2–1. Subsequently, however, Slovakia would be broken down by Sweden 0–1 before getting totally thrashed by Spain 0–5, thus finished third, but with the worst goal difference due to scoring own goals as a result of their disastrous performance. Slovakia was eliminated from the group stage for the first time ever.

Stadiums
The Slovakia national football team currently plays its home matches at the Tehelné pole in Bratislava and the Štadión Antona Malatinského in Trnava. Štadión pod Dubňom in Žilina was used from 2003 to 2015, but will not be used in the future because of the artificial grass installed in 2016. In the past, home games have occasionally been played at other venues as Všešportový areál and Štadión Lokomotívy in Košice, Štadión pod Zoborom in Nitra, Mestský štadión in Dubnica nad Váhom, and Tatran Stadion in Prešov.

Stadiums which have hosted Slovakia international football matches:

Team image

Nickname
 
Traditionally in Slovakia the team is typically referred to as the Repre (short for Reprezentácia – translates into national team). 
However, in 2016, during the buildup to Slovakia's first appearance at the European Championship, SFZ introduced a new nickname for the team. National team was given the nickname Slovenskí sokoli (Slovak falcons). U15 through to U21 national teams were given the nickname Slovenskí sokolíci (Slovak little falcons). Despite lack of immediate identification with the nickname by the fans, it went into usage during the tournament and the subsequent qualification for the 2018 FIFA World Cup and is now often used, especially in the media, along with Repre, which still remains to be preferred in an informal conversation.

Kit

Slovakia's home kit since 1993 was blue, but Slovakia changed their home kit from blue to white, which lasted until 2020, when Slovakia changed its home kit to blue once again. The team wears either a set of white jerseys, shorts and socks or a set of blue jerseys, shorts and socks. A combination of a blue jersey and white shorts has also been used in some matches. Until recently, the official shirt supplier was Puma, which had signed a long-term agreement with the Slovak Association until 2026, but in 2016 the Association announced the contract had been terminated and that the national team would be supplied by Nike, which had previously supplied the team from 1995 to 2005.

Results and fixtures 

Below shows the results of all A-level international matches played within the last 12 months, as well as any future matches that have been scheduled.

2022

2023

Coaching staff

Coaching history
1939–1944

1993–present

Players

Current squad

The following players 25 players were called up for two home UEFA Euro 2024 qualifiers against Luxembourg (23 March 2023) and Bosnia and Herzegovina (26 March 2023).
Caps and goals correct as of 20 November 2022, after the match against Chile.

Recent call-ups
The following players have also been recognised in national team nominations within the last twelve months.

Notes
 INJ Withdrew/Unavailable due to an injury or an illness.
 ALT Alternate – replaces a member of the squad in case of injury/unavailability
 RET Retired from international football

Player recordsPlayers in bold are still active in the national team.Most appearances

Top goalscorers

Competitive record
FIFA World Cup

UEFA European Championship

UEFA Nations League

Head-to-head record
The following table shows Slovakia's all-time international record, correct as of 20 November 2022 after a match against Chile.
At the time of the match against Gibraltar, it was a member of UEFA, but not FIFA. Record with defunct teams is marked in italics.

Honours
Major tournaments
FIFA World Cup
 Appearances (1): 2010
UEFA European Championship
 Appearances (2): 2016, 2020
Football at the Summer Olympics
 Appearances (1): 2000

Minor titles
King's Cup
Winners (2): 2004, 2018
Kirin Cup
Winners (1): 2000
Third-place (2): 2002, 2004
Shanghai International Football Tournament
Runner-up (1): 1992

Runner up (1): 2000
Cyprus International Football Tournaments
Third place (2): 1998, 2003
Friendship Tournament (UAE)
Third place (1): 1994

Recognitions
FIFA Best Mover of the Year
Runner-up (1): 2014
Slovak Sportsperson of the Year – Team Award
Winners (4): 2009, 2010, 2014, 2015
Runner-up (1): 2016

Czechoslovakia
As a part of Czechoslovakia (1918–1939 and 1945–1993), Slovak footballers achieved multiple major successful campaigns with the Czechoslovak national team. Notably, for example, 16 of the 22 players on the Czechoslovak squad playing in the final tournament of UEFA Euro 1976 in Yugoslavia were Slovak. In both the semi-final against Netherlands and the final match against West Germany 9 of the 13 fielded players were Slovak.

The following table shows the major international successes of the Czechoslovak national team, with participation of Slovak footballers.

 FIFA World Cup:
 Runners-up (2):'' 1934, 1962
 UEFA European Championship:
 Winners (1): 1976
 Third place (2): 1960, 1980

See also

Slovakia national under-21 football team
Slovakia national under-19 football team
Slovakia national under-18 football team
Slovakia national under-17 football team
Slovakia national under-16 football team
Slovakia national under-15 football team

Notes

References

External links

Slovak Football Association official website
Profile at FIFA official website
Profile at UEFA official website
RSSSF archive of results 1939–2009
RSSSF archive of most capped players and highest goalscorers

 
European national association football teams
National Team